David B. Sandalow (born 1957) is the Inaugural Fellow at Columbia University's Center on Global Energy Policy.  He has served in senior positions at the White House, State Department and U.S. Department of Energy.  At Columbia, Sandalow also serves as Co-Director of the Energy and Environment Concentration at the School of International and Public Affairs.  

From Spring 2009 to Spring 2013, Sandalow served in positions at the United States Department of Energy, including Under Secretary of Energy (acting) and Assistant Secretary for Policy & International Affairs 

Prior to his appointment at the U.S. Department of Energy, he was a Senior Fellow, Foreign Policy Studies, and Energy and Environment Scholar at the Brookings Institution. He also chaired the Energy & Climate Change Working Group at the Clinton Global Initiative.

He was Executive Vice President at the World Wildlife Fund from 2001 to 2003.

He has also served as Assistant Secretary of State for Oceans and International Environmental and Scientific Affairs, U.S. State Department.
(Brookings Bio
picture

Sandalow serves on the Board of ReNew Power, India's largest renewable power developer, and as an advisor to a number of other companies.

He earned a B.A. from Yale and J.D. from University of Michigan Law School.

Freedom From Oil
He wrote Freedom From Oil: How the Next President Can End the United States' Oil Addiction.The plot centers around a fictional Presidential Plan to End Oil Dependence, detailed below:

Offering to buy 30,000 plug-in hybrid vehicles (PHEVs) at an $8,000 premium.
Committing after their delivery that half the vehicles purchased by the federal government will be PHEVs. That's a much stronger version of Pres. George W. Bush's order.
Legislation to retool US auto factories and assume some auto industry health costs.
Consumer tax credits of $8,000 for the first million PHEVs and $4,000 for the second million.
Replacing Corporate Average Fuel Economy standards with Fuel Reduction and Energy Efficiency (FREEdom) standards
A Federal Battery Guarantee Corporation to help manufacturers provide 10-year battery warranties for the first million cars.

He also authored the 2009 Brookings Institution book Plug-In Electric Vehicles: What Role for Washington?''

See also 
 Jon Wellinghoff

References

External links 
 OnPoint, 16 October 2007: Brookings Institution's David Sandalow lays out plan to end United States' oil addiction

1957 births
Living people
Hybrid electric vehicle advocates
Obama administration personnel
United States Department of Energy officials
United States Department of State officials
University of Michigan Law School alumni
Yale College alumni